NPP may refer to:

Politics
National People's Power, Sri Lanka 
National Patriotic Party, Liberia
National People's Party (The Gambia)
National People's Party (India), a political party in India founded by PA Sangma
National Peoples Party (Pakistan), a regional political party in Pakistan
National People's Party (South Africa), a mostly-regional political party in South Africa
National Progress Party of Armenia, Armenia
National Progressive Party (Finland)
New Patriotic Party, Ghana
New People's Party (Hong Kong)
New Power Party, Taiwan 
New Progressive Party of Puerto Rico
New Progressive Party (South Korea)
Northern People's Party, Ghana

Science
Suomi NPP (Suomi National Polar orbiting Partnership), an American weather satellite
Net Primary Productivity
Nobel Prize in Physics
Normal probability plot
N-Phenethyl-4-piperidinone
N-Terminal peptide of proopiomelanocortin
Nucleotide pyrophosphatase/phosphodiesterase
para-Nitrophenylphosphate

Other
New Payments Platform, money transfer method in Australia 
New Perspective on Paul, in Biblical studies 
Nobel Peace Prize
Non-Public Property, a Canadian military term
Notepad++, a text editor
Nuclear power plant
Nuclear pulse propulsion, for rockets